St Mary's Church, Aston Brook is a former parish church in the Church of England in Birmingham. The church was demolished in the 1970s.

The church was built in 1863 to designs of the architect James Murray. It was consecrated by Henry Philpott, Bishop of Worcester, on Thursday 10 December 1863. The tower was added in 1882. The church was equipped with a two manual pipe organ by Norman and Beard. A specification of the organ can be found on the National Pipe Organ Register.

In 1864, a parish was formed out of the parishes of St. Peter and St. Paul, Aston, St Silas’ Church, Lozells, and St Matthew's Church, Duddeston. The church opened a school for Girls and Infants in 1868.

The church is noted for having a rugby club which played a match against a team from Villa Cross Wesleyan Chapel in Handsworth. For the team from Villa Cross Wesleyan Chapel, this was their first match as Aston Villa Football Club. As a condition of the match, the Villa side had to agree to play the first half under rugby football rules and the second half under association football rules.

References

Church of England church buildings in Birmingham, West Midlands
Churches completed in 1863
Mary